Misunderstood is a 2014 Italian drama film directed by Asia Argento. It was selected to compete in the Un Certain Regard section at the 2014 Cannes Film Festival.

Plot
Aria is the sensitive little daughter of a female concert pianist and an actor. Both neglect her in favour of their children from earlier relationships. Eventually she also has to face the fact that both parents are heading for a divorce.

Cast
 Giulia Salerno as Aria
 Charlotte Gainsbourg as Mother
 Gabriel Garko as Father
 Gianmarco Tognazzi as Dodo
 Justin Pearson as Ricky
 Anna Lou Castoldi as Donatina
 Max Gazzè as Manuel Ginori
 Alice Pea as Angelica
 Carolina Poccioni as Lucrezia
 The Penelopes as The Penelopes (music band)

Reception
On Rotten Tomatoes, the film has an approval rating of 80% based on 15 critics, and the average rating is 6.7/10.

Peter Sobczynski from Roger Ebert.com gave it a 3.5 out of 4 stars, and wrote "An occasionally strange, occasionally brutal and occasionally lovely work that goes up on the shelf with 'The Ocean of Helena Lee' and 'Girlhood' as one of the more impressive coming-of-age tales of recent times." The A.V. Club Adam Nayman gave it a C+, and stated "The ostensible boldness of Misunderstood is undermined by the sense that it's also pandering-that its view of childhood as a bourgeois horror-show is at least as salable on the art-house circuit as it is authentic to its creator's experiences."

References

External links
 
 

2014 films
2014 drama films
Italian drama films
2010s Italian-language films
Films directed by Asia Argento
Films about children
Films about dysfunctional families
Films set in Rome
Films set in 1984